Mark Garrett (born August 19, 1965) is an American bareback rider.

Life and career 
Garrett was born in Gettysburg, South Dakota. He is the brother of Marvin Garrett, a bareback rider.

In 2015, Garrett was inducted into the ProRodeo Hall of Fame.

References 

1965 births
Living people
Bareback bronc riders
ProRodeo Hall of Fame inductees